Stephen Arthur Hurd (born January 25, 1968) is an American gospel musician. He started his music career, in 2000, with the release of, Minister Stephen A. Hurd & Corporate Worship, Vol. 1, that was released by Hurd the Word Music. His second album, In the Overflow, Vol. 2, was released by Integrity Music in 2001. The third release, A Call to Worship, was released by Integrity Records alongside Epic Records and Sony Urban in 2004. This would be his first album to breakthrough on the Billboard magazine Gospel Albums chart. He released his fourth album, My Destiny, with Integrity Music alongside Columbia Records in 2006, and this charted on the aforementioned chart. The fifth album, Times of Refreshing, released in 2008 with Integrity Music, again this charted on the aforementioned chart. His sixth album released in 2012 by HYW Music, O That Men Would Worship, and this charted on the aforementioned chart.

Early life
Hurd was born on January 25, 1968, as Stephen Arthur Hurd, in Washington, D.C., where he was reared in the church. After graduating from The Duke Ellington School of the Arts, he attended Howard University. He became an ordained minister in 1988, at which point he started leading worship services at local churches. He has served as the Minister of Music at the First Baptist Church of Glenarden since May 2001.

Music career
He began Corporate Worship in 1999, and they released a few albums under that moniker. His solo music career started in 2000, with the release of Minister Stephen A. Hurd & Corporate Worship, Vol. 1 by Hurd the Word Music, yet this failed to chart. His subsequent album, In the Overflow, Vol. 2, was released by Integrity Music in 2001, and this did not chart. The next album, A Call to Worship, was released by Integrity Music alongside Epic Records and Sony Urban on June 8, 2004, and this was his first release to break through on the Billboard magazine Gospel Albums chart, at No. 15. He released My Destiny, with Integrity Music in association with Columbia Records, on October 3, 2006, and this peaked at No. 11 on the Gospel Albums chart. The following album, Times of Refreshing, was released on October 14, 2008 by Integrity Music, and this charted at No. 8 on the Gospel Albums chart. His latest release, O That Men Would Worship, was released by HYW Music in 2012, and the album again placed at No. 8 on the aforementioned chart.

Discography

References

External links
 Official website
 Cross Rhythms profile

1968 births
Living people
African-American songwriters
African-American Christians
Musicians from Washington, D.C.
Songwriters from Washington, D.C.
American male songwriters
Epic Records artists
Columbia Records artists
21st-century African-American people
20th-century African-American people